o-Anisic acid is an organic compound with the formula .  A colorless solid, it is one of the isomers of anisic acid.

The compound has been well studied with respect to intramolecular hydrogen bonding and as a substrate for various catalystic reactions.

References

Benzoic acids
O-methylated phenols
Salicylyl ethers